Edward Floyd may refer to:

Edward Floyd (impeached barrister) (1621–1648), Englishman impeached and sentenced by Parliament
Edward Floyd (Medal of Honor) (1850–1923), US Navy sailor
Eddie Floyd (born 1937), American singer-songwriter

See also
Edward Floyd-Jones (1823–1901), New York politician
Edward Lloyd (disambiguation)